Dactylella is a genus comprising 72 species of mitosporic fungi in the family Orbiliaceae. They are notable for trapping and eating nematodes.

Members of this genus form a noose structure from several elongate cells. When stimulated by a nematode passing through the structure, the cells swell, tightening the noose and trapping the nematode. Filaments then grow into the nematode to absorb nutrients.

Species
Dactylella acrochaeta Drechsler 1952
Dactylella alaskana Matsush. 1975
Dactylella alba (Preuss) Sacc. 1886
Dactylella ambrosia (Gadd & Loos) K.Q. Zhang, Xing Z. Liu & L. Cao 1995
Dactylella anisomeres Drechsler 1962
Dactylella aphrobrocha Drechsler 1950
Dactylella arcuata Scheuer & J. Webster 1990
Dactylella arnaudii Yadav 1960
Dactylella atractoides Drechsler 1943
Dactylella attenuata Xing Z. Liu, K.Q. Zhang & R.H. Gao 1997
Dactylella beijingensis Xing Z. Liu, C.Y. Shen & W.F. Chiu 1992
Dactylella candida (Nees) de Hoog 1985
Dactylella chichisimensis Ts. Watan. 2001
Dactylella cionopaga Drechsler 1950
Dactylella clavata R.H. Gao, M.H. Sun & Xing Z. Liu 1995
Dactylella clavispora J. Chen, L.L. Xu, B. Liu & Xing Z. Liu 2007
Dactylella coccinella Ying Yang & Xing Z. Liu 2005
Dactylella coelobrocha Drechsler 1947
Dactylella copepodii G.L. Barron 1990
Dactylella coprophila Faurel & Schotter 1965
Dactylella crassa Z.Q. Miao, Lei & Xing Z. Liu 1999
Dactylella cystospora R.C. Cooke
Dactylella dasguptae (S.K. Shome & U. Shome) de Hoog & Oorschot 1985
Dactylella deodycoides  Drechsler
Dactylella dianchiensis Y. Hao & K.Q. Zhang 2004
Dactylella dorsalia Y. Zhang bis, Z.F. Yu & K.Q. Zhang 2007
Dactylella formosana J.Y. Liou, G.Y. Liou & Tzean 1995
Dactylella formosensis Sawada 1959
Dactylella fusariispora (Mekht.) K.Q. Zhang, Xing Z. Liu & L. Cao 1995
Dactylella fusiformis Grove
Dactylella gampsospora (Drechsler) de Hoog & Oorschot 1985
Dactylella gephyropaga Drechsler 1937
Dactylella haptospora Drechsler) K.Q. Zhang, Xing Z. Liu & L. Cao 1995
Dactylella heptameres Drechsler 1943
Dactylella heterospora Drechsler 1943
Dactylella huisuniana J.L. Chen, T.L. Huang & Tzean 1998
Dactylella implexa (Berk. & Broome) Sacc. 1886
Dactylella inquisitor Jarow. 1971
Dactylella intermedia T.F. Li, Lei & Xing Z. Liu 1998
Dactylella lignatilis M.H. Mo & K.Q. Zhang 2005
Dactylella lysipaga Drechsler 1937
Dactylella mammillata S.M. Dixon 1952
Dactylella megalobrocha Glockling 1994
Dactylella microaquatica Tubaki 1957
Dactylella nuorilangana X.F. Liu & K.Q. Zhang 2006
Dactylella oxyspora (Sacc. & Marchal) Matsush. 1971
Dactylella panlongana X.F. Liu & K.Q. Zhang 2006
Dactylella papayae Sawada 1959
Dactylella passalopaga Drechsler 1936
Dactylella piriformis (Preuss) Sacc. 1886
Dactylella plumicola Grove 1916
Dactylella polycephala Drechsler 1937
Dactylella polyctona (Drechsler) K.Q. Zhang, Xing Z. Liu & L. Cao 1995
Dactylella pseudoclavata Z.Q. Miao & Xing Z. Liu 2003
Dactylella pulchra (Linder) de Hoog & Oorschot 1985
Dactylella ramosa Matsush. 1971
Dactylella rhombica Matsush. 1971
Dactylella rhopalota Drechsler 1943
Dactylella sclerohypha Drechsler 1950
Dactylella shizishanna X.F. Liu & K.Q. Zhang 2003
Dactylella stenobrocha Drechsler 1950
Dactylella stenocrepis Drechsler 1962
Dactylella strobilodes Drechsler 1950
Dactylella tenuis Drechsler 1943
Dactylella thaumasia Drechsler 1937
Dactylella turkmenica Soprunov 1958
Dactylella ulmi Puttemans
Dactylella vermiformis Z.F. Yu, Ying Zhang & K.Q. Zhang 2007
Dactylella xinjiangensis J. Chen, L.L. Xu, B. Liu & Xing Z. Liu 2007
Dactylella yoaniae Y.D. Zhang & X.G. Zhang 2011
Dactylella yunnanensis K.Q. Zhang, Xing Z. Liu & L. Cao 1995
Dactylella zhongdianensis J. Zhang & K.Q. Zhang 2005

References

Deuteromycota
Helotiales
Carnivorous fungi